Ernst David (1864 – c. 1918) was a German musical instrument maker in the city of Bielefeld, Germany.

By the time David was twenty (in 1885), it is believed he was already doing business under his own name. By 1888 he was making musical instruments. By 1904 his business had grown to become a small instrument factory. After his death the factory kept the name of Ernst David, but was owned by his son Albert David.

The instrument company specialized in making brass instruments, many of which were used by Posaunen (brass horns) choirs in Protestant congregations in Germany and beyond. Johannes Kuhlo collaborated with Ernst David to develop the Kuhlohorn for use by Posaunen choirs.
Some Ernst David instruments are still in regular use. Several examples can be found in musical instrument collections.

Presently it is not clear when the instrument factory stopped operating; most likely it was during World War II.

References
William Waterhouse. "The new Langwill index: A dictionary of musical wind-instrument makers and inventors", 1st edition 1993
Lyndesay G. Langwill, "An Index of Musical Wind Instrument Makers", 5th edition 1977
Archived City Address Books for the City of Bielefeld, Germany, 1888, 1898, 1904, 1914, 1933-1940, 1950, 1960

External links

Kuhlo Flugel Horn c.1885
BBb Tuba c.1918
Kuhlohorn auf www.europeana.eu Museum Instrumentenkunde Universität Leipzig u.a.(Germany).

1864 births
1918 deaths
German musical instrument makers